Benton County is located in the northwest part of the U.S. state of Indiana, along the border with Illinois. As of 2010, the county's population was 8,854. It contains six incorporated towns as well as several small unincorporated settlements; it is divided into 11 townships which provide local services. The county seat is Fowler.

Benton County is part of the Lafayette, Indiana, Metropolitan Statistical Area.

History
The lands of present NW Indiana were explored by French explorer Robert de LaSalle. At that time the area was inhabited by the Miami Confederation of Indians. Through White settlement, encroachment, and confrontation, the various indigenous groups were forced to cede their claim to the area. In October 1818, the Pottawattamies, Weas, and Delawares ceded their lands west of the Tippecanoe River to the government. In a treaty dated 23 October 1826, the Pottawattamie and Miamis ceded all their lands east of the Tippecanoe. A treaty dated 26 October 1832 with the Pottawattamie ceded control of the northwestern part of Indiana; on 27 October the Pottawattamie of Indiana and Michigan also relinquished all claim to any remaining land in those states.

Before 1832, this area was not open to settlement; previous settlers had taken the southern parts of Ohio, Indiana and Illinois. Northwestern Indiana was also less desirable for farming, being described as alternate swamps, sterile sand ridges and flat, wet prairies, although it did proliferate in game.

A state legislative act dated 7 February 1835 created two counties in this area, Newton and Jasper. The county governments were not created at that time and the counties were attached to White County for administrative purposes. The Jasper County organization was effected beginning 15 March 1838. On 18 February 1840, the county of Benton was formed from Jasper's area. It was named for Thomas H. Benton (D), U.S. Senator from Missouri. The original county seat selected in 1843 was Oxford, but after a long struggle between contending factions it was moved to Fowler in 1874.

Courthouse 
The current Benton County courthouse, located in Fowler, was designed by Gurdon P. Randall of Chicago and built in 1874 by Levi L. Leach at a cost of $62,257. The new courthouse was an impressive building from an architectural standpoint, but also provided much-needed improvements in security, including large fire-proof vaults. Randall had designed the Marshall County courthouse a few years earlier.

Economy
In 2008 the Benton County Wind Farm began operating with 87 1.5 MW wind turbines. Duke Energy purchases electricity from the wind farm and sells it to customers through its GoGreen program.

In 2009 the Fowler Ridge Wind Farm opened nearby, giving Benton County one of the largest concentrations of wind turbines in the United States east of the Mississippi River.

Geography

Benton County lies along the state's western border with Illinois. It consists of low rolling hills, with all available terrain devoted to agriculture or development. However, a knoll  NNW of Boswell is shown on official topographic maps as  ASL.

Adjacent counties

 Newton County - northwest
 Jasper County - northeast
 White County - east
 Tippecanoe County - southeast
 Warren County - south
 Vermilion County, Illinois - southwest
 Iroquois County, Illinois - west

Cities and towns

 Fowler
 Otterbein (west half)
 Oxford
 Boswell
 Earl Park
 Ambia

Unincorporated towns

 Atkinson
 Barce
 Chase
 Dunnington
 Fargo
 Foresman
 Free
 Freeland Park
 Gravel Hill
 Handy
 Lochiel
 Powley Corners (partial)
 Raub
 Swanington
 Talbot
 Templeton
 Wadena

Extinct towns
 Dunn
 Sheff

Townships

 Bolivar
 Center
 Gilboa
 Grant
 Hickory Grove
 Oak Grove
 Parish Grove
 Pine
 Richland
 Union
 York

Major highways

  U.S. Route 52
  U.S. Route 41
  State Road 18
  State Road 55
  State Road 71
  State Road 352

Railroads
 Bee Line Railroad
 Kankakee, Beaverville and Southern Railroad

Education
The county's four public schools are administered by the Benton Community School Corporation.
 Benton Central Junior-Senior High School 
 Boswell Elementary School (closed at end of May 2021) 
 Otterbein Elementary School
 Prairie Crossing Elementary School
 Sacred Heart Elementary, the county's only parochial school

Climate and weather

Government

The county government is a constitutional body granted specific powers by the Constitution of Indiana and the Indiana Code. The county council is the legislative branch of the county government, controlling spending and revenue collection. Representatives, elected to staggered four-year terms from county districts, determine salaries, the annual budget and special spending. The council has limited authority to impose local taxes, in the form of an income and property tax that is subject to state level approval, excise taxes and service taxes. In 2010, the county budgeted approximately $5 million for the district's schools and $2.8 million for other county operations and services, for a total annual budget of approximately $7.8 million.

The Board of Commissioners is the county's executive body. They are elected countywide, in staggered four-year terms. One commissioner serves as board president. The commissioners execute acts legislated by the council, collecting revenue and managing day-to-day functions of the county government.

The county maintains a small claims court that can handle some civil cases. The court judge is elected to a term of four years and must be a member of the Indiana Bar Association. The judge is assisted by a constable who is elected to a four-year term. In some cases, court decisions can be appealed to the state level circuit court.

The county has several other elected offices, including sheriff, coroner, auditor, treasurer, recorder, surveyor and circuit court clerk. They are elected to four-year terms. Members elected to county government positions are required to declare party affiliations and be residents of the county.

Each township has a trustee who administers rural fire protection and ambulance service, provides poor relief and manages cemetery care, among other duties. The trustee is assisted in these duties by a three-member township board. The trustees and board members are elected to four-year terms.

Benton County is in Indiana's 4th Congressional District, represented by Jim Baird in the United States Congress. It is part of Indiana Senate district 6 and Indiana House of Representatives district 13. It had previously been part of House District 15.

Demographics

As of the 2020 United States Census, there were 8,719 people and 3,432 households in the county. There were 3,939 housing units. The racial makeup of the county was 92.1% White, 1.1% Black or African American, 0.2% Asian, 0.3% American Indian or Native Alaskan, 0.1% Native Hawaiian or other Pacific Islander, and 1.3% from two or more races. Those of Hispanic or Latino origin made up 5.4% of the population. In terms of ancestry, 25.6% were German, 12.9% were Irish, 5.4% were English, and 5.2% were French (not Basque).

Of the 3,432 households, 31.2% had children under the age of 18 living with them. The average household size was 2.49. The median age was 40.5 years old. Of the total population, 18.5% have a visual or non-visual disability.

The median income for a household in the county was $49,488 and the median income for a family was $57,131 and $32,055 for nonfamily households. The per capita income for the county was $25,187. Additionally, 13.5% of the population were below the poverty line, including 19.4% of those under age 18 and 5.8% of those age 65 or over.

Of the total 2020 population, 6.5% of were veterans. Regarding educational attainment, 42.8% earned a high school diploma or equivalent and 16.1% a bachelor's degree or higher. Of those employed, 20.4% work in education, health care and social services; 19.9% work in manufacturing, 10.1% work in retail, and 8.6% work in agriculture, forestry, fishing, hunting or mining. Finally, 35.4% of science, technology, engineering and math jobs are held by females.

In Benton County, there were 3,783 housing units and 74% of the population owned homes in 2020 with 23.1% of the housing stock occupied by renters.

See also
 National Register of Historic Places listings in Benton County, Indiana

Notes

References

Bibliography

External links

 Benton 4 Business (economic development)
 Official County website

 
Indiana counties
1840 establishments in Indiana
Populated places established in 1840
Lafayette metropolitan area, Indiana
Sundown towns in Indiana